Microdesmus is a genus of wormfishes native to the Atlantic Ocean and the eastern Pacific Ocean.

Species
There are currently 16 recognized species in this genus:
 Microdesmus aethiopicus (Chabanaud, 1927) (Chabanaud's wormfish)
 Microdesmus affinis Meek & Hildebrand, 1928 (Olivaceous wormfish)
 Microdesmus africanus C. E. Dawson, 1979 (West African wormfish)
 Microdesmus bahianus C. E. Dawson, 1973 (Bahia wormfish)
 Microdesmus carri C. R. Gilbert, 1966 (Stippled wormfish)
 Microdesmus dipus Günther, 1864 (Banded worm goby)
 Microdesmus dorsipunctatus C. E. Dawson, 1968 (Spotback wormfish)
 Microdesmus hildebrandi Reid, 1936 (Dark-tailed worm goby)
 Microdesmus intermedius Meek & Hildebrand, 1928 (Long-tailed worm goby)
 Microdesmus knappi C. E. Dawson, 1972 (Colombian wormfish)
 Microdesmus lanceolatus C. E. Dawson, 1962 (Lancetail wormfish)
 Microdesmus longipinnis (Weymouth, 1910) (Pink wormfish)
 Microdesmus luscus C. E. Dawson, 1977 (Blind wormfish)
 Microdesmus multiradiatus Meek & Hildebrand, 1928 (Giant wormfish)
 Microdesmus retropinnis D. S. Jordan & C. H. Gilbert, 1882 (Rearfin wormfish)
 Microdesmus suttkusi C. R. Gilbert, 1966 (Spotside wormfish)

References

Microdesmidae
Gobiidae
Marine fish genera
Taxa named by Albert Günther